Wolves Hunt at Night (French: Les Loups chassent la nuit, Italian: La ragazza di Trieste) is a 1952 French-Italian spy thriller film directed by Bernard Borderie and starring Jean-Pierre Aumont, Carla Del Poggio and Fernand Ledoux. It was shot at the Billancourt Studios in Paris and on location in Trieste and Venice. The film's sets were designed by the art director René Moulaert.

Synopsis
A French secret agent is summoned by his superior, the head of a counterespionage organisation, to Trieste where he is takes with trying to unmask a potential enemy operating in Venice. His attempts are obstructed by an attractive cabaret singer who may be working with the opposition.

Cast 
 Jean-Pierre Aumont as Cyril Dormoy, an agent of Mollert
 Carla Del Poggio as  Catherine, the friend of Cyril, singer of cabaret 
 Fernand Ledoux as Thomas Mollert, journalist and leader of a spy ring of counterespionage 
 Marcel Herrand as Pedro, the director of cabaret
 John Kitzmiller as the black servant of Miguel
 Roldano Lupi as Miguel, spy and salable falsehood of pictures 
 Nicolas Vogel as Jim, the driver of Mollert
 Attilio Dottesio as Baum, alias: "Horner", a spy
 Gianni Rizzo as the Italian commissioner
 Sophie Sel as an employee of the hotel
 Louis de Funès as the barman servant
 Tancrédi as the driver

References

Bibliography
 Gili, Jean A. & Tassone, Aldo. Parigi-Roma: 50 anni di coproduzioni italo-francesi (1945-1995). Editrice Il castoro, 1995.
 Marie, Michel. The French New Wave: An Artistic School. John Wiley & Sons, 2008.

External links 
 
 Les Loups chassent la nuit (1952) at the Films de France

1952 films
1950s spy films
French spy films
Italian spy films
1950s French-language films
Films directed by Bernard Borderie
Films produced by Raymond Borderie
Films based on French novels
French black-and-white films
Pathé films
Films shot at Billancourt Studios
Films shot in Venice
Films set in Trieste
Films set in Venice
Films scored by Joseph Kosma
1950s French films
1950s Italian films
French-language Italian films